Islamic Azad University, Qazvin Branch (Danushgah-e Âzad-e Eslâmi-ye Vahed-e Qezvin) is a private university in Qazvin, Iran.

Vision 
The university, the frontrunner in national and regional higher education contributing to society by training a new generation of innovative managers and experts. Considering the vast economic, cultural, technological, and social developments, university is committed to meeting the emerging educational and research needs through designing and developing educational courses and multiple services, drawing on modern technology and state of the art educational systems as well as through collaboration with overseas universities. As its next mission,  university is striving to become an international university. It  is  now  collaborating  with  some  accredited  universities  in  the  areas  of  research  and  education.

History 
The University was founded in 1992. The university now has about 15,000 students in 100 programs and gives out degrees at the associates, Bachelor,  Masters and PhD levels.

Campus
IAUQB main campus is north of Tehran-Rasht highway in Barajin district. Most of the campus land is developed.

The main campus contains more than 15 buildings; five buildings are colleges: 
 College of Biomedical Engineering, Electrical, IT & Computer Sciences
 College of Civil Engineering
 College of Architecture  
 College of Industrial & Mechanical Engineering
 College of Accounting & Management
 College of Technical Diplomas (Navab college; not on the main campus)

The main campus is one of the most beautiful in the country. It has one of the largest Iranian collegiate mosques.

The campus has unique recreation and entertainment facilities. There are modern workshops, laboratory and technological units. Mechatronics Research Laboratory and Incubator Center of technology units are on the main campus. The central library of the university with a collection in excess of 130,000 books is a suitable place for research; the glass-face library allows it to use daylight for study hall.

In 2014 after the burial of soldiers killed in the 1980s Iran–Iraq War, cultural authorities of the university decided to construct a monument over their tomb. The monument was completed in 2015. It is an architectural adaptation of Attar of Nishapur's famous poetry book The Conference of the Birds and shows seven valleys of love.

Academics 
The university offers four academic degree programs: associate, B.A/B.Sc, MSc, and PhD.

Biomedical Engineering, Electrical, IT & Computer Sciences School
The faculty offered BSc in Computer Engineering (Software, Hardware), Electrical Engineering (Electronics, Control), and Information Technology, and the Associate diploma in discontinuous computing during the years 1993, 96, 97, 98 to 2003. Other fields of study in discontinuous BSc in Electrical Engineering (Electronics) were added to the faculty programme from 1999 to 2003. The education office of graduate studies commenced its activities in the faculty in 2003, with four fields of study in the faculty of Electrical, Computer, and IT Engineering. Moreover, the number of alumni in Computer Engineering (software) is 5 and the number of the received thesis is 60.

Due to increasing numbers of students and demand for education space, this faculty has been transferred from its former place, the faculty of Associate Diploma in Navab, to its new building on Shahid Abbaspur Campus.

The present faculty space is 9,682 square meters, including 37 classes, 6 classes equipped with audio-visual equipment, and 15 classes equipped with laboratory and workshop equipment for computer and electronic work. Currently, 3,882 students are enrolled in the faculty.

There are 33 academic staff in the faculty, as well as 42 guest lecturers. The above numbers are related to technical courses. There are 8 academic staff and 6 guest lecturers in the departments of Mechatronics, Computer Engineering (software, artificial intelligence), and IT Engineering.

Mechatronics Research Laboratory (MRL) 
The Mechatronics Research Laboratory was established in 2003 as an independent research center under the supervision the university. One of its activities is participating in the RoboCup international competition.

References

External links 
Official university website

Educational institutions established in 1992
Islamic Azad University branches
Qazvin
1992 establishments in Iran
Universities in Iran
Education in Qazvin Province
Buildings and structures in Qazvin Province